Ghotour Bridge is a railway bridge in Khoy County, West Azarbaijan Province, Iran, over the river Ghotour.  It is an arch bridge, was completed in 1970, and has a length of 442.9 m. (1453 ft.) with the largest span being 223.1 m. (732 ft.).

Notes

Buildings and structures in West Azerbaijan Province
Bridges in Iran
Architecture in Iran
Bridges completed in 1970
Railway bridges in Iran
Transportation in West Azerbaijan Province